Cricket All-Stars (better known as Cricket All-Stars Series) was an exhibition Twenty20 cricket series took place in the United States in 2015. The series features two lineups of renowned retired cricket players from around the world, led by cricket icons – Sachin Tendulkar of India and Shane Warne of Australia.

Teams
The All-Stars Series was a set of games played between Sachin's Blasters led by Sachin Tendulkar and Warne's Warriors led by Shane Warne.

List of series
The inaugural series was held across three cities in the United States. The second series was announced to be held in September/October 2017 but later it got scrapped due to issues between Sachin Tendulkar & Shane Warne; it hasn't returned thereafter.

Awards

2015 tournament

Squads
The two captains selected their respective squads by randomly drawing out the player names on 5 November 2015 at Times Square.

Sachin's Blasters

Warne's Warriors

Venues
All three matches of the series played in baseball stadiums. Initially in June 2015, Wrigley Field in Chicago and Yankee Stadium in New York were booked as venues, along with Dodger Stadium in Los Angeles. However, in October 2015, the former two venues were replaced by New York Mets' home ballpark Citi Field and Houston Astros' home ballpark Minute Maid Park. The first match was a day game in New York, while the second and third played under lights in Houston and Los Angeles respectively.

A curator from New Zealand was hired to prepare drop-in pitches in Minneapolis to be delivered to the three stadiums.

Umpires

Marais Erasmus from South Africa who is currently a member of the ICC Elite Umpire Panel and Simon Taufel and Steve Davis from Australia who were former (now retired) members of the ICC Elite Umpire Panel are the three experienced umpires who were selected to perform the duties of the on-field umpires and the third umpire in all the three games on a rotation basis.

Fixtures

1st match

2nd match

3rd match

Trophy 
The All-Stars Trophy and team shirts were unveiled by Tendulkar and Warne along with their respective team's player rosters, on 5 November 2015 in Times Square, United States.

Broadcasting

References

External links
 Official website

Defunct cricket competitions
Twenty20 cricket leagues